Sangdong station is a railway station on the Gyeongbu Line in South Korea.

Railway stations in South Gyeongsang Province
Miryang
Railway stations opened in 1906
1906 establishments in Korea